Nebria panshiri is a species of ground beetle in the Nebriinae subfamily that is endemic to Afghanistan.

References

panshiri
Beetles described in 1997
Endemic fauna of Afghanistan
Beetles of Asia